Emarginula paivana is a species of sea snail, a marine gastropod mollusk in the family Fissurellidae, the keyhole limpets.

Description

Distribution
This species occurs in the Atlantic Ocean off Madeira.

References

 Crosse H. (1867). Description d'un genre nouveau de la famille des Fissurellidae. Journal de Conchyliologie. 15(1): 74-78.

External links
 Check List of European Marine Mollusca (CLEMAM).

Fissurellidae
Gastropods described in 1867